Cello rock and cello metal are subgenres of rock music characterized by the use of cellos (as well as other bowed string instruments such as the violin and viola) as primary instruments, alongside or in place of more traditional rock instruments such as electric guitars, electric bass guitar, and drum set.

Cellos, often in groups of three or more, are used to create a sound, rhythm, and texture similar to that of familiar rock music, but distinctly reshaped by the unique timbres and more traditional genres of the cello (in particular) and other string instruments used. The cellos and other stringed instruments are often amplified and/or modified electronically, and often played in a manner imitative of the sound of electric guitars. They are often combined with other elements typical of rock music such as rock-style vocals and drumming.

Cello rock can trace its beginnings back to the 1971 self-titled debut, known in the US as No Answer, by the Electric Light Orchestra which featured rock songs arranged for cellos, and the subsequent tour consisted of a standard rock band augmented by four cellos. Jeff Lynne made a return with this format using three cellos for their 2001 comeback album Zoom and its subsequent, but cancelled tour.  Starting in 2011, the duo 2Cellos began releasing covers of many rock standards,  such as AC/DC's "Thunderstruck", and undertaking tours.

See also
 Symphonic rock
 Cello in popular music

References

20th-century music genres
21st-century music genres
British rock music genres
British styles of music
Rock